Placer is an unincorporated community in Josephine County, Oregon, United States, on Grave Creek a few miles east of Interstate 5. Established during the local gold mining boom, it is considered a ghost town.

History
Placer was unofficially established in 1885 as "Tom East" and platted in 1898 by pioneer landowner L. M. Browning, who had arrived in the area in 1870. Tom East was an early southwest Oregon miner, who came to the U.S. from England as a young man. He was mining in Josephine County by 1855, and at least three Tom East Creeks and one East Creek were named for him. In the 1870s, he prospected and mined along the Rogue River, eventually settling on Brushy Bar near the future site of the community of Marial, where he lived until his death in 1897.

The first post office at this locale was applied for in 1893 by Newell Fillmore Inman with the name Tom East, but the Post Office Department changed the name to "Placer". Placer was named for the placer mines in the area. Placer post office ran from 1894 to 1924, with mail then going to Leland.
	
Placer was established as a supply center for the Tom East and Upper Grave Creek mines and was on the stagecoach line between New Leland and the Greenback Mine. In its heyday, Placer had two large hotels, two large mercantiles and three saloons—the only ones on Upper Grave Creek—as well as other small businesses, including a newspaper edited by Nellie Anderson. Placer grew rapidly with the development of the Columbia placer mine and the Greenback quartz mine, which was the richest mine in Oregon by feet of tunnel mined.

See also
Golden, Oregon, another mining ghost town in Josephine County
List of ghost towns in Oregon

References

Ghost towns in Oregon
Populated places established in 1885
Unincorporated communities in Josephine County, Oregon
1898 establishments in Oregon
Populated places established in 1898
Unincorporated communities in Oregon